Space Shuttle Columbia (OV-102) was a Space Shuttle orbiter manufactured by Rockwell International and operated by NASA. Named after the first American ship to circumnavigate the upper North American Pacific coast and the female personification of the United States, Columbia was the first of five Space Shuttle orbiters to fly in space, debuting the Space Shuttle launch vehicle on its maiden flight in April 1981. As only the second full-scale orbiter to be manufactured after the Approach and Landing Test vehicle Enterprise, Columbia retained unique features indicative of its experimental design compared to later orbiters, such as test instrumentation and distinctive black chines. In addition to a heavier fuselage and the retention of an internal airlock throughout its lifetime, these made Columbia the heaviest of the five spacefaring orbiters; around  heavier than Challenger and  heavier than Endeavour. Columbia also carried ejection seats based on those from the SR-71 during its first six flights until 1983, and from 1986 onwards carried an imaging pod on its vertical stabilizer.

During its 22 years of operation, Columbia was flown on 28 missions in the Space Shuttle program, spending over 300 days in space and completing over 4,000 orbits around Earth. While it was seldom used after completing its objective of testing the Space Shuttle system, and its heavier mass and internal airlock made it less than ideal for planned Shuttle-Centaur launches and dockings with space stations, it nonetheless proved useful as a workhorse for scientific research in orbit following the loss of Challenger in 1986. Columbia was used for eleven of the fifteen flights of Spacelab laboratories, all four United States Microgravity Payload missions, and the only flight of Spacehab's Research Double Module. The Extended Duration Orbiter pallet was used by the orbiter in thirteen of the pallet's fourteen flights, which aided lengthy stays in orbit for scientific and technological research missions. Columbia was also used to retrieve the Long Duration Exposure Facility and deploy the Chandra observatory, and also carried into space the first female commander of an American spaceflight mission, the first ESA astronaut, the first female astronaut of Indian origin, and the first Israeli astronaut.

At the end of its final flight in February 2003, Columbia disintegrated upon reentry, killing the seven-member crew of STS-107 and destroying most of the scientific payloads aboard. The Columbia Accident Investigation Board convened shortly afterwards concluded that damage sustained to the orbiter's left wing during the launch of STS-107 fatally compromised the vehicle's thermal protection system. The loss of Columbia and its crew led to a refocusing of NASA's human exploration programs and led to the establishment of the Constellation program in 2005 and the eventual retirement of the Space Shuttle program in 2011. Numerous memorials and dedications were made to honor the crew following the disaster; the Columbia Memorial Space Center was opened as a national memorial for the accident, and the Columbia Hills in Mars' Gusev crater, which the Spirit rover explored, were named after the crew. The majority of Columbias recovered remains are stored at the Kennedy Space Center's Vehicle Assembly Building, though some pieces are on public display at the nearby Visitor Complex.

History

Construction began on Columbia in 1975 at Rockwell International's (formerly North American Aviation/North American Rockwell) principal assembly facility in Palmdale, California, a suburb of Los Angeles. Columbia was named after the American sloop Columbia Rediviva which, from 1787 to 1793, under the command of Captain Robert Gray, explored the US Pacific Northwest and became the first American vessel to circumnavigate the globe. It's also named after the command module of Apollo 11, the first crewed landing on another celestial body. Columbia was also the female symbol of the United States.  After construction, the orbiter arrived at Kennedy Space Center on March 25, 1979, to prepare for its first launch. Columbia was originally scheduled to lift off in late 1979, however the launch date was delayed by problems with both the RS-25 engine and the thermal protection system (TPS). On March 19, 1981, during preparations for a ground test, workers were asphyxiated in Columbia's nitrogen-purged aft engine compartment, resulting in (variously reported) two or three fatalities.

The first flight of Columbia (STS-1) was commanded by John Young, a veteran from the Gemini and Apollo programs who was the ninth person to walk on the Moon in 1972, and piloted by Robert Crippen, a rookie astronaut originally selected to fly on the military's Manned Orbital Laboratory (MOL) spacecraft, but transferred to NASA after its cancellation, and served as a support crew member for the Skylab and Apollo-Soyuz missions.

Columbia spent 610 days in the Orbiter Processing Facility (OPF), another 35 days in the Vehicle Assembly Building (VAB), and 105 days on Pad 39A before finally lifting off.  It was successfully launched on April 12, 1981, the 20th anniversary of the first human spaceflight (Vostok 1), and returned on April 14, 1981, after orbiting the Earth 36 times, landing on the dry lakebed runway at Edwards Air Force Base in California.  It then undertook three further research missions to test its technical characteristics and performance. Its first operational mission, with a four-man crew, was STS-5, which launched on November 11, 1982. At this point Columbia was joined by Challenger, which flew the next three shuttle missions, while Columbia underwent modifications for the first Spacelab mission.

In 1983, Columbia, under the command of John Young on what was his sixth spaceflight, undertook its second operational mission (STS-9), in which the Spacelab science laboratory and a six-person crew was carried, including the first non-American astronaut on a space shuttle, Ulf Merbold. After the flight, it spent 18 months at the Rockwell Palmdale facility beginning in January 1984, undergoing modifications that removed the Orbiter Flight Test hardware and updating it to similar specifications as those of its sister orbiters. At that time the shuttle fleet was expanded to include Discovery and Atlantis.

Columbia returned to space on January 12, 1986, with the launch of STS-61-C. The mission's crew included Dr. Franklin Chang-Diaz, and the first sitting member of the House of Representatives to venture into space, Bill Nelson.

The next shuttle mission, STS-51-L, was undertaken by Challenger. It was launched on January 28, 1986, ten days after STS-61-C had landed, and ended in disaster 73 seconds after launch. Prior to the accident, Columbia had been slated to be ferried to Vandenberg Air Force Base to conduct fueling tests and to perform a flight readiness firing at SLC-6 to validate the west coast launch site. In the aftermath, NASA's shuttle timetable was disrupted, and the Vandenberg tests, which would have cost $60 million, were canceled. Columbia was not flown again until 1989 (on STS-28), after which it resumed normal service as part of the shuttle fleet.

STS-93, launched on July 23, 1999, was the first U.S. space mission with a female commander, Lt. Col. Eileen Collins. This mission deployed the Chandra X-ray Observatory.

Columbias final complete mission was STS-109, the fourth servicing mission for the Hubble Space Telescope. Its next mission, STS-107, culminated in the orbiter's loss when it disintegrated during reentry, killing all seven of its crew.

Consequently, President George W. Bush decided to retire the Shuttle orbiter fleet by 2010 in favor of the Constellation program and its crewed Orion spacecraft. The Constellation program was later canceled with the NASA Authorization Act of 2010 signed by President Barack Obama on October 11.

Construction milestones

First operational orbiter

Weight
As the second orbiter to be constructed and the first able to fly into space, Columbia was roughly  heavier than subsequent orbiters such as Endeavour, which were of a slightly different design and had benefited from advances in materials technology. In part, this was due to heavier wing and fuselage spars, the weight of early test instrumentation that remained fitted to the avionics suite, and an internal airlock that, originally fitted into the other orbiters, was later removed in favor of an external airlock to facilitate Shuttle/Mir and Shuttle/International Space Station dockings. Due to its weight, Columbia could not have used the planned Centaur-G booster (canceled after the loss of Challenger). The retention of the internal airlock allowed NASA to use Columbia for the STS-109 Hubble Space Telescope servicing mission, along with the Spacehab double module used on STS-107. Due to Columbia's higher weight, it was less ideal for NASA to use it for missions to the International Space Station, though modifications were made to the Shuttle during its last refit in case the spacecraft was needed for such tasks.

Thermal protection system

Externally, Columbia was the first orbiter in the fleet whose surface was mostly covered with High & Low Temperature Reusable Surface Insulation (HRSI/LRSI) tiles as its main thermal protection system (TPS), with white silicone rubber-painted Nomex – known as Felt Reusable Surface Insulation (FRSI) blankets – in some areas on the wings, fuselage, and payload bay doors. FRSI once covered almost 25% of the orbiter; the first upgrade resulted in its removal from many areas, and in later flights, it was only used on the upper section of the payload bay doors and inboard sections of the upper wing surfaces. The upgrade also involved replacing many of the white LRSI tiles on the upper surfaces with Advanced Flexible Reusable Surface Insulation (AFRSI) blankets (also known as Fibrous Insulation Blankets, or FIBs) that had been used on Discovery and Atlantis. Originally, Columbia had 32,000 tiles – the upgrade reduced this to 24,300. The AFRSI blankets consisted of layers of pure silica felt sandwiched between a layer of silica fabric on the outside and S-Glass fabric on the inside, stitched together using pure silica thread in a 1-inch grid, then coated with a high-purity silica coating. The blankets were semi-rigid and could be made as large as 30" by 30". Each blanket replaced as many as 25 tiles and was bonded directly to the orbiter. The direct application of the blankets to the orbiter resulted in weight reduction, improved durability, reduced fabrication, and installation cost, and reduced installation schedule time. All of this work was performed during Columbia's first retrofitting and the post-Challenger stand-down.

Though the orbiter's thermal protection system and other enhancements had been refined, Columbia would never weigh as little unloaded as the other orbiters in the fleet. The next-oldest shuttle, Challenger, was also relatively heavy, although  lighter than Columbia.

Markings and insignia
{{multiple image
| align             = right
| direction         = vertical
| image1            = B747 with Space Shuttle on it from above.jpg
| width1            = 250
| image2            = Endeavour after STS-126 on SCA over Mojave from above.jpg
| width2            = 250
| caption2          = A top view of Columbia and Endeavour is shown. Note that Columbia'''s chines are black unlike the white ones of Endeavour and the other orbiters.
}}Columbia was the only operational orbiter with black chines. These were added because at first, shuttle designers did not know how reentry heating would affect the craft's upper wing surfaces. The chines allowed Columbia to be easily recognized at a distance, unlike the subsequent orbiters. The chines were added after Columbia arrived at KSC in 1979. The only other orbiter with black chines was Pathfinder, but it was a cosmetic test article and only gained it when was refurbished.

Additionally, until its last refit, Columbia was the only operational orbiter with wing markings consisting of an American flag on the port (left) wing and the letters "USA" on the starboard (right) wing.  Challenger, Discovery, Atlantis, and Endeavour all, until 1998, bore markings consisting of the letters "USA" above an American flag on the left-wing, and the pre-1998 NASA "worm" logotype afore the respective orbiter's name on the right-wing. Enterprise, the test vehicle which was the prototype for Columbia, originally had the same wing markings as Columbia but with white chines and the "USA" letters on the right-wing spaced closer together. Enterprises markings were modified to match Challenger in 1983. The name of the orbiter was originally placed on the payload bay doors much like Enterprise but was placed on the crew cabin after the Challenger disaster so that the orbiter could be easily identified while in orbit.

From its last refit to its destruction, Columbia bore markings identical to those of its operational sister orbiters–the NASA "meatball" insignia on the left-wing and the American flag afore the orbiter's name on the right-wing.

SILTS pod
Another unique external feature, termed the "SILTS" pod (Shuttle Infrared Leeside Temperature Sensing), was located on the top of Columbia's vertical stabilizer, and was installed after STS-9 to acquire infrared and other thermal data. Though the pod's equipment was removed after initial tests, NASA decided to leave it in place, mainly to save costs, along with the agency's plans to use it for future experiments. The vertical stabilizer was later modified to incorporate the drag chute first used on Endeavour in 1992.

OEX/MADS "black box"
One unique feature that permanently stayed on Columbia from STS-1 to STS-107 was the OEX (Orbiter Experiments) box or MADS (Modular Auxiliary Data System) recorder. On March 19, 2003, this "black box" was found slightly damaged but fully intact by the U.S. Forest Service in San Augustine County in Texas after weeks of search and recovery efforts after the Space Shuttle Columbia disaster. The OEX/MADS was not designed to survive a catastrophic loss like an airplane black box.

Other upgradesColumbia was originally fitted with Lockheed-built ejection seats identical to those found on the SR-71 Blackbird. These were active for the four orbital test flights, but deactivated after STS-4, and removed entirely after STS-9.  Columbia was the only spaceworthy orbiter not delivered with head-up displays for the Commander and Pilot, although these were incorporated after STS-9. Like its sister ships, Columbia was eventually retrofitted with the new MEDS "glass cockpit" display and lightweight seats.

Planned future

Had Columbia not been destroyed, it would have been fitted with the external airlock/docking adapter for STS-118, an International Space Station assembly mission, originally planned for November 2003. Columbia was scheduled for this mission due to Discovery being out of service for its Orbital Major Modification, and because the ISS assembly schedule could not be adhered to with only Endeavour and Atlantis.Columbia's career would have started to wind down after STS-118. It was to service the Hubble Space Telescope two more times between 2004 and 2005. Following the Columbia accident, NASA flew the STS-125 mission using Atlantis, combining the planned fourth and fifth servicing missions into one final mission to Hubble. Because of the retirement of the Space Shuttle fleet, the batteries and gyroscopes that keep the telescope pointed will eventually fail, which would result in its reentry and break-up in Earth's atmosphere.  A "Soft Capture Docking Mechanism", based on the docking adapter that was to be used on the Orion spacecraft, was installed during the last servicing mission in anticipation of this event.

FlightsColumbia flew 28 missions, gathering 300.74 days spent in space with 4,808 orbits and a total distance of  until STS-107.

Though having been in service during the Shuttle-Mir and International Space Station programs, Columbia did not fly any missions that visited a space station. The other three active orbiters at the time had visited both Mir and the ISS at least once. Columbia was not suited for high-inclination missions.

Mission and tribute insignias

* Mission canceled following the Challenger disaster.

** Mission flown by Endeavour due to loss of Columbia on STS-107.

Final mission and destruction

[[File:ColumbiaFLIR2003.png|thumb|Rare Day TV (DTV) imaging photograph of Columbia's disintegration captured by an AH-64D Apache's gun camera during training with RNLAF (Royal Netherlands Air Force) personnel out of Fort Hood, Texas]]Columbia was destroyed at about 09:00 EST on February 1, 2003, while re-entering the atmosphere after a 16-day scientific mission. The Columbia Accident Investigation Board determined that a hole was punctured in the leading edge on one of Columbia's wings, which was made of a carbon composite. The hole had formed when a piece of insulating foam from the external fuel tank peeled off during the launch 16 days earlier and struck the shuttle's left wing. During the intense heat of re-entry, hot gases penetrated the interior of the wing, likely compromising the hydraulic system and leading to control failure of the control surfaces. The resulting loss of control exposed minimally protected areas of the orbiter to full-entry heating and dynamic pressures that eventually led to vehicle break up.

The report delved deeply into the underlying organizational and cultural issues that the board believed contributed to the accident. The report was highly critical of NASA's decision-making and risk-assessment processes. Further, the board determined that, unlike NASA's early claims, a rescue mission would have been possible using the Shuttle Atlantis, which was essentially ready for launch and might have saved the Columbia crew members. The nearly 84,000 pieces of collected debris of the vessel are stored in a large room on the 16th-floor of the Vehicle Assembly Building at the Kennedy Space Center. The collection was opened to the media once and has since been open only to researchers. Unlike Challenger, which had a replacement orbiter built, Columbia did not.

The seven crew members who died aboard this final mission were: Rick Husband, Commander; William C. McCool, Pilot; Michael P. Anderson, Payload Commander/Mission Specialist 3; David M. Brown, Mission Specialist 1; Kalpana Chawla, Mission Specialist 2; Laurel Clark, Mission Specialist 4; and Ilan Ramon, Payload Specialist 1.

Tributes and memorials

Patricia Huffman Smith Museum
The debris field encompassed hundreds of miles across Texas extending into Louisiana and Arkansas. The nose cap and remains of all seven crew members were found in Sabine County, East Texas.

To honor those who lost their lives aboard the shuttle and during the recovery efforts, the Patricia Huffman Smith NASA Museum "Remembering Columbia" was opened in Hemphill, Sabine County, Texas. The museum tells the story of Space Shuttle Columbia explorations throughout all its missions, including the final STS-107. Its exhibits also show the efforts of local citizens during the recovery period of the Columbia shuttle debris and its crew's remains. An area is dedicated to each STS-107 crew member, and also to the Texas Forest Service helicopter pilot who died in the recovery effort. The museum houses many objects and artifacts from NASA and its contractors, the families of the STS-107 crew and other individuals. The crew's families contributed personal items of the crew members to be on permanent display. The museum features two interactive simulator displays that emulate activities of the shuttle and orbiter. The digital learning center and its classroom provide educational opportunities for all ages.

Columbia Memorial Space Center
The Columbia Memorial Space Center is the U.S. national memorial for the Space Shuttle Columbias seven crew members. It is located in Downey, California on the site of the Space Shuttle's origin and production, the former North American Aviation plant in Los Angeles County, California. The facility is also a hands-on learning center with interactive exhibits, workshops, and classes about space science, astronautics, and the Space Shuttle program's legacy—providing educational opportunities for all ages.

Naming dedications

The Shuttle's final crew was honored in 2003 when the United States Board on Geographic Names approved the name Columbia Point for a  mountain in Colorado's Sangre de Cristo Mountains, less than a half-mile from Challenger Point, a peak named after America's other lost Space Shuttle. The Columbia Hills on Mars were also named in honor of the crew, and a host of other memorials were dedicated in various forms.

The Columbia supercomputer at the NASA Advanced Supercomputing (NAS) Division located at Ames Research Center in California was named in honor of the crew lost in the 2003 disaster. Built as a joint effort between NASA and technical partners SGI and Intel in 2004, the supercomputer was used in scientific research of space, the Earth's climate, and aerodynamic design of space launch vehicles and aircraft. The first part of the system, built in 2003, was dedicated to STS-107 astronaut and engineer Kalpana Chawla, who prior to joining the Space Shuttle program worked at Ames Research Center.

A female bald eagle at the National Eagle Center in Wabasha, Minnesota is named in tribute to the victims of the disaster.

Media tributes
Guitarist Steve Morse of the rock band Deep Purple wrote the instrumental "Contact Lost" in response to the tragedy, recorded by Deep Purple and featured as the closing track on their 2003 album Bananas. It was dedicated to the astronauts who died in the disaster.  Morse donated songwriting royalties to the families of lost astronauts. Astronaut and mission specialist engineer Kalpana Chawla, one of the victims of the accident, was a fan of Deep Purple and had exchanged e-mails with the band during the flight, making the tragedy even more personal for the group. She took three CDs into space with her, two of which were Deep Purple albums Machine Head and Purpendicular. Both CDs survived the destruction of the shuttle and the 39-mile plunge.

Several songs in popular music give minor tribute, and some are dedicated. The Eric Johnson instrumental "Columbia" from his 2005 album Bloom was written as a commemoration and tribute to the lives that were lost. Johnson said "I wanted to make it more of a positive message, a salute, a celebration rather than just concentrating on a few moments of tragedy, but instead the bigger picture of these brave people's lives." The Scottish band Runrig pays tribute to Clark on the 2016 album The Story. The final track, "Somewhere", ends with a recording of her voice. Clark was a Runrig fan and had a wake up call with Runrig's "Running to the Light". She took The Stamping Ground CD into space with her. When the shuttle exploded the CD was found back on Earth, and was presented to the band by her family.

In popular culture

 Fans of the original Star Trek television series were largely responsible for NASA naming the first Space Shuttle Enterprise. In the television series Star Trek: Enterprise both the first and second starships of the human-built NX-Class, registry numbers NX-01 and NX-02 respectively, were named in honor of pre-existing NASA Space Shuttles. The second vessel's name was first revealed in the season 3 episode "E²" to be Columbia, in honor of the Space Shuttle Columbia following its destruction on February 1, 2003. The uniforms on NX-02 Columbia bear a crew patch depicting 7 stars, in honor of the astronauts who died in the accident.
 The 1982 documentary film Hail Columbia focuses on the first mission of the shuttle.
 The 1982 Rush song "Countdown" is about the launch of STS-1. All three members of the group were present at the launch, and the credits of the album Signals dedicated the song to "astronauts Young & Crippen and all the people of NASA for their inspiration and cooperation".
 Crew members from Mission STS-73 (Ken Bowersox, Catherine G. Coleman, Kathryn C. Thornton, Frederick W. Leslie, and Albert Sacco) were featured in the Home Improvement television show in the 1996 episode "Fear of Flying" as well as scenes from the shuttle mission.
 Homer Hickam's 1999 novel Back to the Moon is mostly set on Columbia. The structural differences between Columbia and the other shuttles are central to the plot.
 In the 2000 finale of the first season of The West Wing, "What Kind of Day Has It Been", Columbia does not land on schedule due to technical problems with a door mechanism. Toby Ziegler's brother is on board. The shuttle lands successfully by the end of the episode.
 In the episode "Wild Horses" of the anime Cowboy Bebop, the Columbia rescues Spike in his spaceship, Swordfish, from burning up in the atmosphere after he runs out of fuel and is trapped in Earth's gravitation. The Columbia is only alluded to as a hidden project the character Doohan is working on throughout the episode until it is rolled out and launches to rescue Spike. After the daring rescue the space shuttle crashes on re-entry but all people on board survive.
 The 2006 Long Winters song "The Commander Thinks Aloud" is said to be about the 2003 disaster.
 In the first generation of the Pokémon video game series a model of a Space Shuttle titled "Space Shuttle Columbia" is seen in the Pewter Science Museum. In subsequent remakes it is just titled "Space shuttle" after the 2003 disaster.

See also
 List of human spaceflights
 List of Space Shuttle crews
 List of Space Shuttle missions
 List of spaceflight-related accidents and incidents
 Timeline of Space Shuttle missions

 References 
 Citations 

 Sources 

 

External links

 Last interview of Columbia crew and memorial service with eulogy by singer Patti LaBelle (Google Video)
 Maiden launch of Columbia (Google Video)
 Columbia accident investigation board
 Columbia Crew Survival Investigation Report
  It was compiled by members of usenet newsgroups sci.space.history and sci.space.shuttle, including some employees of NASA and their respective contractor agencies. Much of the FAQ content has been copied and used by many of the news services without credit given, including Florida Today'' and Space.com.
 Space.com Columbia FAQ.
 Shuttle Orbiter Columbia (OV-102) 
 New York Times coverage of the shuttle
 Space Mirror Memorial

 
 Space Shuttle Memorial covering both space shuttle disasters
 How to Do Nostalgia in a Badass Way: Cowboy Bebop 19 “Wild Horses”

Columbia
Columbia
Destroyed spacecraft

Individual rockets
Individual aircraft